Diavoli HC Milano was an ice hockey team in Milan, Italy. The club was formed in 1958 as the successor to Milan-Inter HC.

They competed in the Serie A in most years from 1958 to 1979. Diavoli won the championship in the 1959–60 season, and were coached by Bibi Torriani.

References

Defunct ice hockey teams in Italy
Sport in Milan
1958 establishments in Italy
Ice hockey clubs established in 1958
Ice hockey clubs disestablished in 1979
1979 disestablishments in Italy